Jean Sprackland (born 1962) is an English poet and writer, the author of five collections of poetry and two books of essays about place and nature.

Biography
Originally from Burton upon Trent, Jean Sprackland studied English and Philosophy at the University of Kent at Canterbury, then taught for a few years before beginning to write poetry at age 30. She is Professor of Creative Writing at Manchester Metropolitan University, and was Chair of the Poetry Archive from 2016 to 2020.

Published works
Tattoos for Mothers Day (Spike, 1997)
Hard Water (Cape, 2003)
Ellipsis: Vol. I (with Sean O'Brien and Tim Cooke; Comma Press, 2005)
Our Thoughts are Bees: Working with Writers and Schools (with Mandy Coe; Wordplay Press, 2005)
Tilt (Cape, 2007)
Strands: A Year of Discoveries on the Beach (Cape, 2012)
Sleeping Keys (Random House, 2013)
Green Noise (Cape, 2018)
These Silent Mansions: A life in graveyards (2020)

Translated works
Inclinación. Spanish translation of Tilt (Komorebi Ediciones, Chile, 2018)

Awards and honours
1998: Forward Poetry Prize (Best First Collection) shortlist, Tattoos for Mothers Day
2003: T. S. Eliot Prize shortlist, Hard Water
2003: Whitbread Poetry Award shortlist, Hard Water
2004: Next Generation poet
2007: Costa Poetry Award, Tilt
2007: Forward Poetry Prize (Best Single Poem) shortlist, "The Birkdale Nightingale"
2012: Portico Prize for Literature (Non-fiction), Strands: A Year of Discoveries on the Beach
2021: PEN Ackerley Prize shortlist, These Silent Mansions: A life in graveyards

References

External links
Jean Sprackland
The Poetry Archive - Jean Sprackland
Random House - Jean Sprackland

1962 births
Living people
English poets
English women poets
Costa Book Award winners
Alumni of the University of Kent
Academics of Manchester Metropolitan University
People from Burton upon Trent
Children's poets